SS Iberia may refer to several ships, including:

, a steamship
, an ocean liner

Ship names